.om is the Internet country code top-level domain (ccTLD) for Oman.

Registry
Currently, the Telecommunications Regulatory Authority is the registry of .om ccTLD. The Authority is solely responsible for the management of the top level Internet domain name “.om” and “.عمان” In doing so, the Authority may:

 Set rules, instructions and guidelines for the aforesaid domain names administration.
 Approve the accredited registrars and publish a list of their names in the Authority's  website or by any other means.
 Monitor the accredited registrars and registrants to check their compliance with the rules, instructions and guidance related to the respective domain names.
 Publish the decisions of terminating the accreditation of the accredited registrars in the Authority's website or by any other means.
 Take action concerning appeals and complaints that are submitted by accredited registrars or registrants or any concern party in any matter related to implementing the provisions of this Regulation, but without prejudice to the provisions of the Industrial Property Act and its executive regulation.

.om Zones
The top-level .om consists of the following domain zones:

Accredited registrars 
The accredited registrar is any person or entity authorized by the Authority under an agreement (Registrar Accreditation) to receive registration applications of Internet domains, make a decision, register, transfer, stop, delete them and taking any steps necessary related to the domain names within the defined lines in the Registrar Accreditation Agreement.
 
The Authority will review the applications submitted to it from the firms and establishments wanting to receive accreditation from the Authority and make decisions.

The current Accredited Registrars as of September 2022 are:
 GulfCyberTech
 Ooredoo Oman
 Oman Telecommunication Company
 Oman Digital Data Corporation (Oman Data Park)
 Abu-Ghazaleh Intellectual Property

References

External links 
 Domain Name Administration
 Telecommunication Regulatory Authority

Country code top-level domains
Telecommunications in Oman

sv:Toppdomän#O